Middleton is a town in Essex County, Massachusetts, United States. The population was 9,779 at the 2020 census.

History 
Before European colonial settlement, the area was home to a number of native settlements. The area fell along an ill-defined "border" region between the Massachusett and Pennacook. The tribes in this region generally spoke the Abenaki language, with major local tribes being the Naumkeag and Agawam. Will's Hill in modern-day Middleton was home to a winter village founded by an Algonquin Sachem.

Middleton was first settled by Europeans in 1659, and was officially incorporated in 1728.  Prior to 1728 it was considered a part of Salem, and contains territory previously within the limits of Andover, Boxford, and Topsfield. 

The name Middleton is derived from its location midway between the important early settlements of Salem and Andover. It was first settled by Bray Wilkins, who came from Salem with a large family, having purchased 600 acres from Governor Bellingham. The town grew as a farming community, mostly due to its location on the Ipswich River, with homesteads of hundreds of acres. However, during the 18th century Middleton also contained a vital ironworks industry, located in the area of what is now Mill and Liberty streets. This enterprise originally involved Thomas Flint, Sr. and his son, Thomas Flint Jr, of Salem, John How of  Boxford, and Thomas Cave Jr. of Topsfield and was carried on for approximately seventy years. The area is home to a number of intact homes from the colonial period, such as the Thomas Fuller House, which was constructed in 1684.

Although the town no longer has any functional rail systems, there have been rail lines previously running through the area. Notably, the Essex Railroad had termini in Salem and North Andover, running through Middleton from the mid-1840's through the mid-20th century, when passenger and freight demands dropped off.

In the late 18th and to the mid-19th centuries Middleton was a vacation town to those who lived in areas such as Lawrence and Lowell. It is home to one of the oldest trees in Massachusetts, being approximately 400 years old, and which is located at 39 Peabody Street. The oldest still standing house is the Wilkins house, which was built in 1693, and served as a tavern on the main road between Salem and Lawrence.

Middleton is one of the fastest-growing towns in the Commonwealth, and the fastest on the North Shore.  When locally grouped it is grouped with Salem, Danvers, and Beverly, but also occasionally Topsfield and Boxford, as these three towns are a tri-town. These three towns share Masconomet Regional High School (named after Chief Masconomet, sagamore of the Agawam tribe, which lived in Essex County at the time of English colonization)  which serves grades 9–12, while its middle school serves grades 7 and 8.

Geography and transportation
According to the United States Census Bureau, the town has a total area of 14.5 square miles (37.4 km), of which 14.0 square miles (36.2 km) is land and 0.5 square mile (1.2 km) (3.32%) is water. Middleton lies along the border of Essex County, and is bounded by North Reading in Middlesex County to the west, and North Andover to the northwest, Boxford to the northeast, Topsfield to the east, Danvers to the southeast, Peabody to the south, and shares a 0.3 mile border with Lynnfield to the southwest. Middleton lies eight miles northwest of Salem, 11 miles southeast of Lawrence, and 19 miles north of Boston. Middleton is part of a tri-town with two other towns which are Topsfield and Boxford.

Middleton lies in the low hills of northeastern Massachusetts. The Ipswich River flows through town, flowing from the North Reading/Lynnfield line along the Peabody and Danvers borders before turning northward into town, exiting along the border between Boxford and Topsfield. Several brooks feed into the river throughout town, and the town is also home to two larger ponds, Middleton Pond and Andover Meadow Pond, as well as several smaller ones. Within the town, there are portions of the Harold Parker State Forest and Boxford State Forest, as well as the Peabody Reservation, Sanford Reservation and Middleton Conservation Land.

Middleton lies just west of Interstate 95, with two very short parts of the highway passing through corners of the town before and after passing through Topsfield. There are exits off the highway in Boxford and in Danvers, which both provide access to the town. Route 114, which follows the path of the old "Essex Turnpike", passes through the center of town, and is crossed there by Route 62, which merges with Route 114 for a 0.2 mile stretch there. There is no rail service within town; there are two lines (the Haverhill/Reading Line and the Newburyport/Rockport Line) of the MBTA Commuter Rail to the west and south of town, both of which provide access to Boston's North Station. The nearest small air service is located at Beverly Municipal Airport, with the nearest national and international air service being located at Logan International Airport. Despite the abandonment of the Essex Railroad line, the Middleton Rail Trail Alliance began a project in 2018 to convert the former train lines into walking and biking trails. The trail aims to link with rail trails in neighboring towns, such as the Danvers Rail Trail. Such links could serve to bring the town into the Border to Boston trail system, connecting New Hampshire to Boston via bike trails.

Climate

Demographics

As of the census of 2000, there were 7,744 people, 2,305 households, and 1,744 families residing in the town. The racial makeup of the town was 95.43% White, 1.65% African American, 0.05% Native American, 1.11% Asian, 0.05% Pacific Islander, 0.27% from other races, and 1.43% from two or more races. Hispanic or Latino of any race were 6.26% of the population.

There were 2,305 households, out of which 37.8% had children under the age of 18 living with them, 65.7% were married couples living together, 7.2% had a female householder with no husband present, and 24.3% were non-families. 20.0% of all households were made up of individuals, and 9.3% had someone living alone who was 65 years of age or older.  The average household size was 2.76 and the average family size was 3.22.

In the town, the population was spread out, with 23.0% under the age of 18, 8.4% from 18 to 24, 36.9% from 25 to 44, 22.2% from 45 to 64, and 9.5% who were 65 years of age or older.  The median age was 36 years. For every 100 females, there were 138.9 males.  For every 100 females age 18 and over, there were 147.7 males.

The median income for a household in the town was $145,525 in 2020. The 2020 median income for a family was $146,856.  About 2.1% of families and 3.7% of the population were below the poverty line, including 2.4% of those under age 18 and 11.2% of those age 65 or over.

Notable people

 P. J. Axelsson, Boston Bruins
 Lyndon Byers, Boston Bruins
 Coco Crisp, Boston Red Sox
 Kelly Gibson, PGA Tour golfer
 Shane Hnidy, Boston Bruins
 Corey Johnson, Speaker of the New York City Council
 Kyle McLaren, Boston Bruins
 Brian Rolston, Boston Bruins
 Sergei Samsonov, Boston Bruins
 Tim Thomas, Boston Bruins
 John Tudor, Boston Red Sox, St. Louis Cardinals
 Rasheed Wallace, Boston Celtics
 Jo Jo White, Boston Celtics

Notes

External links

Town of Middleton
Middleton, Massachusetts Genealogy Project

 
Towns in Essex County, Massachusetts
Towns in Massachusetts